Sinarachna is a genus of ichneumon wasps in the family Ichneumonidae. There are about five described species in Sinarachna.

Species
These five species belong to the genus Sinarachna:
 Sinarachna anomala (Holmgren, 1860) g
 Sinarachna ceylonica (Ashmead, 1896) c g
 Sinarachna nigricornis (Holmgren, 1860) c g
 Sinarachna pallipes (Holmgren, 1860) c b
 Sinarachna tropica (Morley, 1912) c g
Data sources: i = ITIS, c = Catalogue of Life, g = GBIF, b = Bugguide.net

References

Further reading

 
 

Pimplinae